is a Japanese athlete. She competed in the women's 3000 metres steeplechase event at the 2019 World Athletics Championships.

References

External links
 

2000 births
Living people
Japanese female middle-distance runners
Japanese female steeplechase runners
Place of birth missing (living people)
World Athletics Championships athletes for Japan
Japan Championships in Athletics winners
21st-century Japanese women